"Baby the Rain Must Fall" is a song written by Elmer Bernstein and Ernie Sheldon and performed by Glenn Yarbrough after he left the Limeliters for a solo career. In early 1965, the track reached #2 on the adult contemporary chart and #12 on the Billboard chart. It also reached #3 in South Africa.

It is the title song of the movie, Baby the Rain Must Fall and is heard during the opening credits.

Yarbrough put it up front on his 1965 album, Baby the Rain Must Fall, which was recorded at RCA Victor's Music Center of the World in Hollywood, California.

The arrangement was by Bread lead singer David Gates.  Earl Palmer played drums.

Other Versions
Chris Connor, on her 1965 album Sings Gentle Bossa Nova.
Trini Lopez

References

1965 songs
1965 singles
RCA Victor singles
Songs with music by Elmer Bernstein